Daugaard-Jensen Land,, is a peninsula in northwestern Greenland. It is a part of the Avannaata municipality.

Daugaard-Jensen Land was named in honour of Jens Daugaard-Jensen (1871–1938), who was Inspector of Greenland between 1900 and 1912.

Geography
Daugaard-Jensen Land is located between Washington Land and the Petermann Glacier. The Cass Fjord is at the southern end, beyond which lies the  Humboldt Glacier. The Pentamerus Range is located in the middle/northern region.

The northern coast runs between Aleqatsiaq Fjord and Bessel Fjord, east of which the Petermann Peninsula extends northwards.

Bibliography
H.P. Trettin (ed.), Geology of the Innuitian Orogen and Arctic Platform of Canada and Greenland. Geological Survey of Canada (1991)

See also
Washington Land Group
Petermann Fjord

References

External links 
Washington Land and Daugaard Land; Description of an airborne combined electromagnetic and magnetic survey in Greenland 1998

Peninsulas of Greenland